Beastmen can refer to: 

 Beastmen (Warhammer), in the Warhammer fantasy setting
 Beasts of Chaos, an army in the Warhammer fantasy setting
 Beastmen, in Dungeons & Dragons: Warriors of the Eternal Sun
 Beastmen, in the manga BNA: Brand New Animal